Sean is common given name in Ireland and Scotland. Alternate spellings include Shawn and Shaun.

Notable people with the name include:

Sean (cartoonist) (born John Klamik; 1935–2005), American cartoonist

A–C
Sean Astin (born 1971), American actor
Sean Avery, Canadian hockey player
Sean Bailey, American television and film producer
Sean Baker (disambiguation), multiple people
Sean Barrett (disambiguation), multiple people
Sean Bean (born 1959), English actor
Sean Berton (born 1979), American football player
Sean Bonniwell (1940–2011), American singer-songwriter, frontman of the rock band The Music Machine
Seán Brady (disambiguation), multiple people
Sean Brewer (born 1977), American football player
Sean Browne (disambiguation), multiple people
Sean Byrne (disambiguation), multiple people
Sean Cain (born 1970), American filmmaker
Sean Caisse (born 1986), American racing driver
Sean Canfield (born 1986), American football player
Sean Carlow (born 1985), Australian figure skater
Sean Colson (born 1975), American basketball player
Sean Carroll (disambiguation), multiple people
Sean Casey (disambiguation), multiple people
Sean Cattouse (born 1988), American football player
Sean Chandler (born 1996), American football player
Sean Chu, Taiwanese-born Canadian politician
Sean Chiplock (born 1990), American voice actor
Sean Clancy (disambiguation), multiple people
Sean Clifford (born 1998), American football player
Sean Collins (disambiguation), multiple people
Sean Connery (1930–2020), Scottish actor and producer
Sean Conover (born 1984), American football player
Seán Considine (born 1981), American football player
Sean Corr (born 1984), American racing driver
Sean Culkin (born 1993), American football player
Seán Cummings (born 1968), Canadian playwright, actor, and director

D–F
Sean Daniel (born 1951), American film producer and movie executive
Sean Daniel (basketball) (born 1989), Israeli basketball player 
Sean Daniels (born 1991), American football player 
Sean Danielsen (born 1982), American guitarist and vocalist
Sean Davis (disambiguation), multiple people
Sean Dawkins (born 1971), American football player
Sean Dillon (disambiguation), multiple people
Sean Doctor (born 1966), American football player
Sean Dougherty (born 1991), American creative artist 
Seán Doherty (disambiguation), multiple people
Sean Douglas (disambiguation), multiple people
Seán Dunne (disambiguation), multiple people
Sean Edwards (disambiguation), multiple people
Sean Elliott (born 1968), American basketball player
Sean Faris, American actor
Sean Fallon (disambiguation), multiple people
Sean Farrell (disambiguation), multiple people
Sean Ferriter, Gaelic footballer
Sean Fitzpatrick (born 1963), New Zealand rugby player
Sean Patrick Flanery (born 1965), American actor, author, and martial artist
Sean Fleming (disambiguation), multiple people
Sean Flynn (disambiguation), multiple people
Sean Foudy (born 1966), Canadian football player
Sean Fraser (disambiguation), multiple people
Sean French (disambiguation), multiple people

G–J
Sean Gannon (musician), English musician with group The Magic Numbers
Séan Garnier (born 1984), French freestyle football star
Sean Gelael (born 1996), Indonesian racing driver
Sean Gilbert (born 1970), American football player and coach
Sean Vincent Gillis (born 1962), American serial killer
Sean Gleeson (disambiguation), multiple people
Sean Green (disambiguation), multiple people
Sean Gregan (born 1974), English footballer
Sean Gunn (born 1974), American actor
Sean Gunn (swimmer) (born 1993), Zimbabwean swimmer
Sean Guthrie (born 1988), American racing driver
Sean Hannity (born 1961), American television host, author, and conservative political commentator
Sean Harlow (born 1994), American football player
Sean Harris, English actor
Sean Harris (American football) (born 1972), American football player
Sean Hayes (disambiguation), multiple people
Sean Hickey (born 1970), American composer
Sean Hickey (American football) (born 1991), American football player
Sean Higgins (disambiguation), multiple people
Sean Hill (disambiguation), multiple people
Sean Hughes (disambiguation), multiple people
Sean Johnson (disambiguation), multiple people
Sean Johnston, Canadian writer
Sean Johnston (rally driver) (born 1990), American rally driver
Sean Jones (disambiguation), multiple people

K–M
Sean Keane (disambiguation), multiple people
Sean Kelly (disambiguation), multiple people
Sean Kennedy (disambiguation), multiple people
Sean Kenney (disambiguation), multiple people
Sean Kilpatrick (born 1990), American basketball player 
Sean Allan Krill (born 1971), American actor
Sean Labanowski (born 1992), Israeli-American basketball player 
Sean LaChapelle (born 1970), American football player
Sean Lahman (born 1968), American author and journalist
Sean Lampley (born 1979), American basketball player
Sean Landeta (born 1962), American football player
Sean Lau (born 1964), Hong Kong actor
Sean Lee (born 1986), American football player
Sean Lennon (born 1975), American musician and composer
Sean Levert (1968–2008), American singer-songwriter
Sean Lissemore (born 1987), American football player
Sean Li, film actor
Sean Lock (1963–2021), English comedian and actor
Sean Locklear (born 1981), American football player
Sean Love (born 1968), American football player
Sean Lumpkin (born 1970), American football player
Sean MacManus (disambiguation), multiple people
Sean Mackin (disambiguation), multiple people
Sean Maguire (disambiguation), multiple people
Sean Mahan (born 1980), American football player
Seán Mahon, Irish actor
Sean Malone (1970–2020), American musician
Sean Maloney (disambiguation), multiple people
Sean Mannion (disambiguation), multiple people
Sean Manuel (born 1973), American football player
Sean Marks (born 1975), New Zealand basketball player
Sean Marquette (born 1988), American actor
Sean Marshall (disambiguation), multiple people
Sean Martin (disambiguation), multiple people
Sean May (born 1984), American basketball player
Sean McAdam (disambiguation), multiple people
Sean McCann (disambiguation), multiple people
Sean McCarthy (disambiguation), multiple people
Sean McDermott (disambiguation), multiple people
Sean McGrath (disambiguation), multiple people
Sean McGuire (disambiguation), multiple people
Sean McHugh (born 1982), American football player
Sean McInerney (born 1960), American football player
Sean McKenna (disambiguation), multiple people
Sean McKeon (born 1997), American football player
Sean McLaughlin (disambiguation), multiple people
Seán McLoughlin (hurler) (born 1935), Irish hurler
Seán "Jack" McLoughlin (born 1990), Irish YouTuber
Sean McManus (disambiguation), multiple people
Sean McNamara (disambiguation), multiple people
Sean McNanie (born 1961), American football player
Sean McVay (born 1986), American football coach
Sean Cameron Michael (born 1969), South African actor, writer, and singer
Sean Michaels (disambiguation), multiple people
Sean Michael Wilson, Scottish comic book writer
Sean Monahan (born 1994), Canadian professional ice hockey player
Sean Moore (disambiguation), multiple people
Sean Moran (born 1973), American football player
Seán Moran (born 1992), Irish hurler
Sean Morey (disambiguation), multiple people
Sean Morrison (disambiguation), multiple people
Sean Murphy (disambiguation), multiple people
Sean Murphy-Bunting (born 1997), American football player
Sean Murray (disambiguation), multiple people

N–R
Sean Newton (born 1988), English footballer
Seann William Scott (born 1976), American actor
Sean O'Brien (disambiguation), multiple people
Seán Ó Ceallaigh (disambiguation), multiple people
Seán O'Connor (disambiguation), multiple people
Sean O'Grady (disambiguation), multiple people
Sean O'Neill (disambiguation), multiple people
Sean O'Sullivan (disambiguation), multiple people
Sean Parker (born 1979), American internet entrepreneur
Sean Paul (born 1973), Jamaican dancehall rapper, singer and record producer
Sean Payton (born 1963), American football player and coach
Sean Penn (born 1960), American actor, screenwriter, film director, activist, and politician
Sean Pertwee (born 1964), English actor
Sean Porter (disambiguation), multiple people
Sean Power (disambiguation), multiple people
Sean Price (1972–2015), American rapper
Sean Rayhall (born 1995), American racing driver
Sean Reid-Foley (born 1995), American baseball player
Sean Renfree (born 1990), American football player
Sean Rhyan (born 2000), American football player
Sean Richardson (disambiguation), multiple people
Sean Riley (American football) (born 1974), American football player
Sean Rodriguez (born 1985), American Major League Baseball player for the Philadelphia Phillies organization
Sean Rogers (disambiguation), multiple people
Sean Rooks (1969–2016), American basketball player
Sean Russell (disambiguation), multiple people
Sean Ryan (disambiguation), multiple people

S–Z
Sean Salisbury (born 1963), American football player
Sean Schemmel (born 1968), American voice actor
Sean Scott (disambiguation), multiple people
Sean Singletary (born 1985), American basketball player
Sean Smith (disambiguation), multiple people
Seán South (1928–1957), Irish Republican Army volunteer
Sean Spence (born 1990), American football player
Sean Spencer (disambiguation), multiple people
Sean Spicer (born 1971), American former White House Press Secretary
Sean Tarwater (born 1969), American politician
Sean Taylor (disambiguation), multiple people
Sean Thomas (disambiguation), multiple people
Seán Treacy (disambiguation), multiple people
Sean Treacy (disambiguation), multiple people
Sean Tse (born 1992), English-born Hong Kong professional footballer
Sean Tucker (American football) (born 2001), American football player
Sean D. Tucker (born 1952), American acrobatic aviator
Sean Tufts (born 1982), American football player
Sean Tuohy (born 1959), American sports commentator and basketball player
Sean Vanhorse (born 1968), American football player
Sean Walker (disambiguation), multiple people
Sean Wallace, American anthologist, editor, and publisher
Sean Walsh (disambiguation), multiple people
Sean Weatherspoon (born 1987), American football player
Sean Whalen (born 1964), American actor and writer
Sean Whyte (disambiguation), multiple people
Sean Williams (disambiguation), multiple people
Sean Wilson (disambiguation), multiple people
Sean Woodside (born 1970), American racing driver
Sean Xiao (born 1991), Chinese actor and singer
Sean Young (born 1959), American actress
Sean Young (soccer) (born 2001), Canadian soccer player
Sean Yseult (born 1966), American musician

See also
Shaun, given name
Shawn (given name)
Shon (given name)

Sean
Sean